Mário Rogério Reis Micale (born 28 March 1969), known as Rogério Micale, is a Brazilian professional football coach and former player

Career
Micale also represented Londrina, Apucarana and Operário Ferroviário before retiring at the age of just 23. He started his managerial career in 1999 with his first club Portuguesa, taking charge of the club's youth setup.

Micale subsequently spent the vast majority of his career in charge of youth sides, notably Figueirense and Atlético Mineiro. On 31 December 2010, he was appointed manager of Grêmio Prudente, but his reign only lasted 21 days. He subsequently returned to Atlético and its youth team.

On 9 May 2015, Micale was named manager of Brazil under-20s, replacing Alexandre Gallo. He achieved a second place in the 2015 FIFA U-20 World Cup, and also was the manager of the under-23s during the 2015 Pan American Games and the 2016 Summer Olympics, winning the latter for the first time in the country's history.

On 20 February 2017, Micale was dismissed by CBF after failing to qualify the under-20s for the year's FIFA U-20 World Cup. On 21 July he returned to Atlético, now appointed manager of the first team. 

Micale was fired on 24 September 2017, after a 3–1 home defeat against Vitória. The following February, he replaced Wagner Lopes at the helm of Paraná.

In February 2021, he became the manager of Saudi club Al Hilal.

Honours
Figueirense
Copa São Paulo de Futebol Júnior: 2008

Atlético Mineiro
Taça Belo Horizonte de Juniores: 2009, 2011

Brazil Olympic
Summer Olympics Gold medal: 2016

Brazil
Pan American Games Bronze medal: 2015

Individual
Saudi Professional League Manager of the Month: March 2021

References

External links
 
 

1969 births
Living people
Sportspeople from Salvador, Bahia
Brazilian footballers
Association football goalkeepers
Associação Portuguesa Londrinense players
Londrina Esporte Clube players
Apucarana Atlético Clube players
Operário Ferroviário Esporte Clube players
Campeonato Brasileiro Série B players
Brazilian football managers
Figueirense FC managers
Grêmio Barueri Futebol managers
Brazil national under-20 football team managers
Clube Atlético Mineiro managers
Paraná Clube managers
Al Hilal SFC managers
Al Dhafra FC managers
Campeonato Brasileiro Série A managers
Campeonato Brasileiro Série B managers
Saudi Professional League managers
UAE Pro League managers
Olympic gold medalists for Brazil
Brazilian expatriate football managers
Brazilian expatriate sportspeople in Saudi Arabia
Expatriate football managers in Saudi Arabia
Brazilian expatriate sportspeople in the United Arab Emirates
Expatriate football managers in the United Arab Emirates